The 1991 Kerala Legislative Assembly election was held on 18 June 1991 to elect members to the Niyamasabha. The incumbent LDF government, which was in power from 1987, decided to seek a fresh mandate one year ahead of the expiry of its term. The decision was prompted by the announcement of the elections to the Lok Sabha and the Front's good showing in the elections to the local bodies held in the previous year.

The elections saw the LDF losing power and the UDF returning to power after four years. K. Karunakaran, the leader of the UDF alliance, was sworn in as the Chief Minister of the state on 24 June 1991.

Results 
Kerala Assembly Election Results in 1991.

References

External links 
 Kerala Assembly Election DATABASE

Kerala
State Assembly elections in Kerala
1990s in Kerala